Medina Province may refer to:

 Medina Province, Cundinamarca, Colombia
 Medina Province (Saudi Arabia)

Province name disambiguation pages